Joint Base Charleston   is a United States military facility located partly in the City of North Charleston, South Carolina and partly in the City of Goose Creek, South Carolina. The facility is under the jurisdiction of the United States Air Force 628th Air Base Wing, Air Mobility Command (AMC).

The facility is an amalgamation of the United States Air Force Charleston Air Force Base and the United States Navy Naval Support Activity Charleston, which were merged on 1 October 2010.

A joint civil-military airport, JB Charleston shares runways with Charleston International Airport for commercial airlines operations on the south side of the airfield and general aviation aircraft operations on the east side.

History
Joint Base Charleston was established in accordance with congressional legislation implementing the recommendations of the 2005 Base Realignment and Closure Commission.  The legislation ordered the consolidation of facilities which were adjoining, but separate military installations, into a single Joint Base, one of 12 formed in the United States as a result of the law.

Today, Joint Base Charleston, encompassing over 20,877 acres and supporting 67 Military Commands and Federal Agencies, provides service to over 79,000 Airmen, Sailors, Soldiers, Marines, Coast Guardsmen, DoD civilians, dependents, and retirees.

In supporting Joint Base Charleston, the former Charleston Naval Base has been transformed into a multi-use Federal Complex (231 acres) with 17 Government and Military tenants, as well as homeport for 6 RO-RO Ready Reserve Force Ships, 3 Coast Guard National Security Cutters, and 2 NOAA Research Ships.
|
On 8 January 2010, the 628th Air Base Wing started its Initial Operational Capability (IOC). The 628th Air Base Wing's primary duties are to provide unsurpassed installation support to 53 DoD and Federal agencies, servicing a total force of over 79,000 Airmen, Sailors, Soldiers, Marines, Coast Guardsmen, civilians, dependents and retirees on Charleston Air Force Base and Naval Weapons Station Charleston. They maintain $2B worth of physical infrastructure across 23 thousand non-contiguous acres. Additionally, they also provide mission-ready expeditionary Airmen to combatant commanders in support of joint and combined operations. The 628th Air Base Wing attained Full Operational Capability (FOC) on 1 October 2010 with an event taking place at Marrington Plantation at the Naval Weapons Station. Since the IOC phase, personnel on the Naval Weapons Station and the Air Force Base have been working vigorously to make Joint Base Charleston a success.

Role and operations

US Air Force 
JB Charleston is home to the 628th Air Base Wing (628 ABW), the host wing for installation support.  The 628th ABW's primary duties are to provide installation support to 53 DoD and Federal agencies, servicing a total force of over 79,000 Airmen, Sailors, Soldiers, Marines, Coast Guardsmen, civilians, dependents and retirees on Charleston AFB and Naval Weapons Station Charleston. Additionally, they also provide expeditionary Airmen to combatant commanders in support of joint and combined operations.

The 437th Airlift Wing (437 AW) operates the C-17 Globemaster III strategic airlift aircraft in support of its mission to provide airlift of troops and passengers, military equipment, cargo, and aeromedical equipment and supplies worldwide in accordance with tasking by Air Mobility Command and unified combatant commanders.

The air base has four operational groups consisting of 21 squadrons and two wing staff directorates.  It is augmented by a parallel, collocated Air Force Reserve Command (AFRC) "associate" wing, the 315th Airlift Wing (315 AW), which shares the same C-17 aircraft with the 437 AW.

In addition, the USAF Auxiliary Civil Air Patrol Coastal Charleston Composite Squadron is also assigned to JB Charleston. They meet at the Aero Club near the control tower.

US Navy 
Portions of The Charleston, South Carolina metropolitan area, (The City of Charleston, The City of North Charleston, The City of Goose Creek, and The City of Hanahan) are home to branches of the United States Military.  During the Cold War, the Naval Base (1902–1996) became the third largest U.S. homeport serving over 80 ships and submarines.  In addition, the Charleston Naval Shipyard repaired frigates, destroyers, cruisers, sub tenders, and submarines.  The Shipyard was also equipped for the refueling of nuclear subs.

During this period, the Weapons Station was the Atlantic Fleet's load out base for all 41 nuclear ballistic missile submarines.  Two SSBN "Boomer" squadrons and a sub tender were homeported at the Weapons Station, while one SSN attack squadron, Submarine Squadron 4, and a sub tender were homeported at the Naval Base.  At the 1996 closure of the Station's Polaris Missile Facility Atlantic (POMFLANT), over 2,500 nuclear warheads and their UGM-27 Polaris, UGM-73 Poseidon, and UGM-96 Trident I delivery missiles (SLBM) were stored and maintained, guarded by a U.S. Marine Corps Security Force Company.

The Naval Support Activity has expanded its mission and Department of Defense support role with over 40 tenant commands, and today is a training center, with the Naval Nuclear Power Training Command (NNPTC), Nuclear Power Training Unit, Propulsion Facility, and Border Patrol satellite academy; Naval Consolidated Brig, Charleston; Mobile Mine Assembly Unit; Explosive Ordnance Detachments; Marine Corps Reserve Center; an engineering complex, with the Naval Information Warfare Center Atlantic (NIWC, this is the largest employer in the Charleston area) and is close to the Naval Facilities Engineering Command Southeast; 269 above-ground ammunition magazines, maintenance and storage of military ordnance including mines, and serves as an Army logistics hub, the busiest continental United States surface port in the defense transportation system.  In addition, NWS Charleston contains more than 1,800 on-base houses for Navy enlisted and officer dependents as well as Coast Guard dependents, and has a child care facility, elementary and middle schools.
   
A large medical clinic near NNPTC in Goose Creek has just finished construction.
   
An Air Force Times article dated 21 December 2009 announced the activation of the 628th Air Wing to "take over administrative duties for a number of military commands" in January 2010. The 628th "will essentially serve as the 'landlord' for Charleston Air Force Base, the Charleston Naval Consolidated Brig and about 50 other military commands. The unit will handle items such as building and grounds services, supply and civil engineering and public works.

Because of the construction, larger and heavier aircraft will now be cleared to land on runway 03/21, which will be key when work scheduled for Fiscal Year 2012 begins on runway 15/33, the base's main runway. The last major work done on Joint Base Charleston runways was in 1968.

Based units

Navy 
Charleston Naval Weapons Station, Joint Base Charleston (>17,000 acres, 27 square miles), Goose Creek and Hanahan
Naval Information Warfare Center Atlantic (NIWC Atlantic) 
Naval Nuclear Power Training Command
Nuclear Power School
Nuclear Power Training Unit
Moored Training Nuclear Submarine, USS Daniel Webster (SSBN-626)
Moored Training Nuclear Submarine, USS Sam Rayburn (SSBN-635)
Moored Training Nuclear Submarine, USS La Jolla (SSN-701) 
Moored Training Nuclear Submarine, USS San Francisco (SSN-711)
Naval Consolidated Brig, Charleston, East Coast
Mobile Mine Assembly Unit Eleven (MOMAU-11)
Naval Operations Support Center Charleston
Navy Reserve Center
Navy Munitions Command CONUS, Detachment Charleston
Explosive Ordnance Detachment
Naval Health Clinic Charleston
Navy Dental Clinic
Naval Criminal Investigative Service Training, Federal Complex
Lay berth for Roll-On Roll-Off Surge Sealift Ships, Ready Reserve Force, Federal Complex
MV Cape Ducato (T-AKR-5051), Maritime Administration RRF Vessel, Federal Complex
MV Cape Douglas (T-AKR-5052), Maritime Administration RRF Vessel, Federal Complex
MV Cape Domingo (T-AKR-5053), Maritime Administration, RRF Vessel, Federal Complex
MV Cape Decision (T-AKR-5054), Maritime Administration RRF Vessel, Federal Complex
MV Cape Diamond (T-AKR-5055), Maritime Administration RRF Vessel, Federal Complex
MV Cape Edmont (T-AKR-5069), Maritime Administration RRF Vessel, Federal Complex

Air Force 
Charleston Air Force Base, Joint Base Charleston (3,877 acres, 6.06 square miles), North Charleston
Charleston Air Force Auxiliary Base, North, SC (2,393 acres, 3.74 square miles)
Charleston Defense Fuel Storage and Distribution Facility, Hanahan  
628th Air Base Wing
628th Mission Support Group
628th Medical Group
315th Airlift Wing
437th Airlift Wing
373rd Training Squadron, Detachment 5
1st Combat Camera Squadron
4th Combat Camera Squadron
412th Logistics Support Squadron OL-AC 
Air Force ROTC Det 772
Civil Air Patrol – Charleston Composite Squadron

Coast Guard 
Coast Guard Sector Charleston (District 7)
Coast Guard Station Charleston
Coast Guard Helicopter Air Facility, Johns Island
Coast Guard Eurocopter HH-65 Dolphin, Johns Island
Coast Guard Reserves, Charleston
Coast Guard Maritime Law Enforcement Academy, Federal Complex
USCGC Hamilton (WMSL-753) National Security Cutter, Federal Complex
USCGC James (WMSL-754) National Security Cutter, Federal Complex
 National Security Cutter, Federal Complex
USCGC Calhoun (WMSL-759) National Security Cutter, 2023 Delivery, Federal Complex
USCGC Friedman (WMSL-760) National Security Cutter, 2023 Delivery, Federal Complex
USCGC Tarpon, Marine Protector-class coastal patrol boat, Tybee Island
USCGC Yellowfin, Marine Protector-class coastal patrol boat, Charleston
USCGC Anvil, Charleston

Army 
United States Army Corps of Engineers, Charleston District
South Carolina Army National Guard
Army Reserve Training Center, Naval Weapons Station
841st Army Transportation Battalion, Naval Weapons Station
1182nd Army Deployment & Distribution Support Battalion, Naval Weapons Station 
1189th Army Transportation Brigade, Reserve Support Command, Naval Weapons Station
Army Strategic Logistics Activity, Naval Weapons Station

Marines 
Marine Corps Reserve Center, Naval Weapons Station

Federal Complex (former Charleston Naval Base), North Charleston 

The former Charleston Naval Base has been transformed into a multi-use Federal Complex (231 acres) with 17 Government and Military tenants, as well as homeport for 6 RO-RO Military Sealift Command Ships, 3 Coast Guard National Security Cutters, and 2 NOAA Research Ships.  In October 2020, the Coast Guard purchased 166 acres on the former Naval complex to construct a super base, so as to consolidate all Charleston area facilities and become the homeport for five Security cutters and additional offshore cutters.

Federal Law Enforcement Training Centers (FLETC), Department of Homeland Security
NOAA Corps
Moored FLETC Training Ship, SS Cape Chalmers (T-AK-5036)
Sea Hawk Interagency Operations Center
Customs and Border Protection Satellite Academy
Immigration and Customs Enforcement Satellite Academy
U.S. Courts, Federal Probation and Pretrial Services Academy
Food and Drug Administration Training Academy
National Oceanic and Atmospheric Administration (NOAA)
National Oceanic and Atmospheric Administration Fisheries Office of Law Enforcement
NOAAS Nancy Foster (R 352) Ship
NOAAS Ronald H. Brown (R 104) Ship
U.S. Department of State
Veterans Administration Goose Creek Clinic
Global Financial Services Center, U.S. Department of State
Passport Service Center, U.S. Department of State
United States Maritime Administration

See also 

 List of United States Air Force installations
 List of United States Navy installations

Sources

References

External links

Naval Support Activity Charleston
 
 

2010 establishments in South Carolina
Buildings and structures in Berkeley County, South Carolina
Buildings and structures in North Charleston, South Carolina
Buildings and structures in Charleston County, South Carolina
Military installations in South Carolina
Joint bases of the U.S. Department of Defense
Military installations established in 2010